Kevin Coleman (born March 1, 1998) is an American soccer player who plays as a forward for BSV Schwarz-Weiß Rehden in the Regionalliga Nord.

Career
Coleman moved to Germany to play with the academy team of 1. FC Kaiserslautern, where he stayed for two years, before moving to Regionalliga Bayern side SpVgg Bayreuth at the end of their 2017-18 season.

Coleman returned to the United States, joining USL Championship side Orange County SC on March 15, 2019.

References

1998 births
Living people
Sportspeople from Fairfax, Virginia
American soccer players
Soccer players from Virginia
Association football forwards
USL Championship players
Regionalliga players
Orange County SC players
1. FC Kaiserslautern players
SpVgg Bayreuth players
BSV Schwarz-Weiß Rehden players
American sportspeople of Ghanaian descent
American expatriate soccer players
American expatriate soccer players in Germany